The climate of Delhi is an overlap between monsoon-influenced humid subtropical (Köppen climate classification Cwa) and semi-arid (Köppen climate classification BSh), with high variation between summer and winter temperatures and precipitation. Delhi's version of a humid subtropical climate is markedly different from many other humid subtropical cities such as São Paulo, New Orleans and Brisbane in that the city features dust storms (something more commonly seen in a desert climate) and wildfire haze (something seen in a tropical climate during the dry season) due to its semi-arid climate.

Although daytime temperatures are warm, Delhi's proximity to the Himalayas results in cold waves leading to lower apparent temperature due to wind chill. Delhi is notorious for its heavy fogs and haze during the winter season. In December, reduced visibility leads to disruption of road, air and rail traffic. Winter ends by the first week of March.

Classifications

Overview of seasonal distribution
 Spring: February, March; warm days, cool nights, pleasant; low to moderate humidity; moderate precipitation
 Summer: April, May, June; hot to very hot; very low to moderate humidity; low precipitation
 Monsoon (Rainy): July, August, September; hot, pleasant during rains; high to very high humidity; heavy precipitation
 Autumn: October, November; warm days, cool nights, pleasant; low humidity; low precipitation
 Winter: December, January; cool days, cold nights; moderate humidity; medium precipitation

Seasons
Delhi lies in the landlocked Northern Plains of the Indian Subcontinent. Its climate is greatly influenced by its proximity to the Himalayas and the Thar Desert, causing it to experience both weather extremes. Delhi has 5 distinct seasons, viz. Summer, Rainy, Autumn, Winter and Spring. Broadly speaking, Delhi has long and scorching summers- sub-divided into dry summer and humid monsoon seasons, short and mildly cold winters, and two bouts of pleasant transition seasons. Two most important wind patterns influencing Delhi's climate are the Western Disturbance and the South-West Winds.

Summer
Summer begins in early April and continues till the middle of June, with the heat peaking in late May and early June. It is characterized by extreme heat, low humidity, very hot winds and thunderstorms. Delhi's proximity to the Thar Desert results in hot, dry continental winds, called loo, at times blowing all across from the West Asian mainland, making the days feel hotter. These winds, blowing over from vast land stretches, are very hot and dry. Since the Western Disturbance depression moves eastward (and is the reason for cyclonic occurrences in Eastern Coastal areas) by this time of the year, there is no moisture-laden wind to increase humidity. The air therefore remains dry or very dry during day. For most of its summer season, Delhi has a semi-arid climate. Coming from Spring, the city witnesses a spurt in day temperature around early April, whereas nights still remain pleasant. By the latter part of April or during early May, maximum temperatures exceed  while the ambience remains very dry. Night temperatures cross the  mark towards the latter part of April. May is Delhi's hottest month during which temperatures may reach  or higher. This month is characterized by frequent thunderstorms. Dust storms are another feature of Delhi's summer, and can be severe and destructive when accompanied by strong winds, particularly under cumulonimbus formation. These are caused due to fine dust brought along by the hot winds arriving from the desert. They make the surroundings appear pale yellow, bring temperatures slightly down and are usually followed by thunderstorms. Post mid-June, temperatures start falling slowly, while humidity shows a gradual rise.
A visual characteristic of summer in Delhi is the summer bloom, particularly the blooming Bougainvillea, Amaltas, Gulmohar, Shireesh and Jacaranda trees, which look spectacular when fully flowering during peak summer in May.

Monsoon
Monsoon winds arrive in Delhi by either the end of June or the first week of July. The arrival of moisture laden South-Western winds, traveling from the Arabian Sea marks the onset of the humid season in Delhi. This season is marked by high levels of humidity and high heat. Day temperatures drop below  as humidity suddenly soars. July is marked by high heat and relatively less precipitation (as compared to August). This transition from scorching to sweltering heat between June and July makes the latter feel very uncomfortable. August is Delhi's wettest month. The heat is considerably reduced and it is relatively cooler for most part of the month. There is dense cloud formation in the sky and at least a week of distinct, heavy rainfall. By September, the amount and frequency of precipitation drops, though humidity remains high. Towards the end of September, moisture content in the air begins to fall and monsoon ends by early October. In India, the Rainy season is referred to as "Rituraani", meaning the Queen of Seasons.

Autumn
The end of monsoon marks the arrival of a transition season. Autumn arrives by early or mid October, and is marked by very dry ambiance, warm days and pleasant nights. Maximum temperatures drop below  by late October and there is a gradual fall in average temperature. Minimum temperature drops below . During Autumn, the wind direction begins changing from South-Westerly to North-Westerly. In recent decades, Delhi has seen a hazardous increase in air pollution levels and haze in the months of October and November caused by stubble burning by farmers in the Indian states lying north of Delhi for fresh sowing at this time of the year, which is exacerbated by the usually almost still air around this time that causes the pollutants to hang in Delhi's air for many days. This season ends by early November.

Winter
Winter arrives in Delhi by early November. Minimum temperatures gradually enter single digits by this time of the year, while days are cool. Though usually not cold initially, December suddenly becomes cold in the latter half, as chilly north-western winds from the Himalayas begin sweeping the Northern Plains. These cold waves are caused by a depression created by Western Disturbance, which bring cloud cover and  winter rains to the Plains, and add to snowfall in the North-Western Indian Subcontinent. Maximum temperatures, too may drop down into single digits and always stay under . When the minimum temperature ventures very close to the  mark, Delhi witnesses frost. Snow is a practical impossibility for Delhi (and the rest of Northern Plains) due to very dry nature of its winter- the coldest conditions happen under clear skies when icy winds rush in from the Himalayas, and a cloud cover (which is necessary for causing snowfall) rather warms the city by trapping heat, thereby junking any possibility of snow. Delhi's winter is marked by very dense fog and haze, which dramatically reduce visibility and makes days colder by cutting off sunlight. In the opposite scenario, cold north-westerly winds from the upper reaches of Himalayas blowing across the city makes the days feel colder, despite any sunshine and the nights further cold. Post mid-January, average temperatures begin to rise very gradually, though the rise is almost contained by the cold north-western winds which result due to very heavy snowfall that occurs in the Himalayas during this part of the month. It may rain towards the end of January and the precipitation is usually accompanied by hail, resulting in slight increase in minimum temperatures due to cloud cover. Maximum temperatures again cross  and days become pleasant.
By mid-February or somewhat beyond, minimum temperatures cross the  mark and days start getting warmer gradually, marking the end of winter.
Delhi can sometimes have a prolonged season of chill, extending into March.

Spring
Around the middle of February, Delhi's climate sees another transition, this time from Winter to Summer. The transition weather is known as Spring and is characterized by warm days, cool nights, dry ambiance and lively natural surroundings. The weather is pleasant and there is warm, brilliant sunshine during the day. For all its characteristics, in India it is referred to as "Rituraaj", meaning the King of Seasons. Spring rains are a characteristic of this season. These rains may be accompanied by hail and can be heavy. Average temperatures show a slow, gradual rise as the wind direction shift from North-West to South-West, thereby getting warmer.

Climate data
Temperature records for Delhi exist for a period of a little over 100 years.

Weather monitoring stations
Delhi has two weather monitoring stations, one at Safdarjung inside the main city and other at Palam on southwest Delhi near the Airport. The readings at Safdarjung station are taken as those for the city, whereas the readings at Palam station are taken as those for the Airport.

Day-length variation
Located at 28°36′36″N latitude, Delhi lies in the sub-tropical belt of earth's North Temperate geographical region, a few latitudes north of the Tropic of Cancer. As such the rotation of earth has its effect on the city's day-length, which shortens during winters and lengthens during summers. Between the two solstices, Delhi's day-length changes by about 4 hours, offset by some 2 hours each at sunrise and sunset.

References

Geography of Delhi
Delhi
Delhi
Environment of Delhi